Sturm is a German surname. Notable people with the surname include:

 Alexander McCormick Sturm (1923–1951), American artist, author, and entrepreneur 
 August Sturm (1865–1943), American businessman
 Christian Sturm (born 1978), German tenor
 Christoph Christian Sturm (1740–1786), German preacher and author
 Felix Sturm (born 1979 as Adnan Ćatić), Bosnian-German boxer
 Florian Sturm (born 1982), Austrian footballer
 Friedrich Sturm (1823–1898), Austrian artist 
 Friedrich Otto Rudolf Sturm (1841–1919), German mathematician
 Helmut Sturm (1932–2008), German artist 
 Jacob Sturm von Sturmeck (1489–1553), German statesman and Reformation leader
 Jacqueline Sturm (born as Te Kare Papuni, 1927–2009), New Zealand writer
 Jacques Charles François Sturm (1803–1855), French-Swiss mathematician
 Johann Christoph Sturm (1635–1703), German philosopher
 Johann Georg Sturm (1742–1793), German natural history illustrator
 Johann Heinrich Christian Friedrich Sturm (1805–1862), German engraver and ornithologist
 Johann Wilhelm Sturm (1808–1865), German botanist, ornithologist, and engraver
 Johannes Sturm (1507–1589), German Protestant reformer
  (1570–1625), German physician and logician
 Lacey Sturm (née Mosley, born 1981), American singer and songwriter
 Marco Sturm (born 1978), German hockey player and coach
 Nico Sturm (born 1995), German ice hockey player
 Pavle Jurišić Šturm (1848–1922), Serbian army general
 Stephan Sturm (born 1963), German businessman

See also
 Strum (surname)
 Joannes Sturmius Mechlinianus (1559–1650), Belgian mathematician, physician, and poet

German-language surnames
Surnames from nicknames